The Republic of the Philippines has a network of diplomatic missions in major cities around the world, under the purview of the Department of Foreign Affairs (DFA), to forward Philippine interests in the areas that they serve, as well as to serve the ever-growing numbers of Overseas Filipinos and Overseas Filipino Workers.

Although the Philippine diplomatic mission network is wide, there are embassies that are accredited to other nations without Philippine diplomatic posts.  The network as of January 2022 consists of 63 embassies, 26 consulates-general, 4 permanent missions to international organizations, and the Manila Economic and Cultural Office (MECO) in Taipei, and its two extension office.

Excluded from this listing are honorary consulates, branches of the Sentro Rizal, overseas offices of the Department of Tourism, and trade missions (with the exception of MECO, which serves as the Philippines's de facto embassy to Taiwan).

History
Although attempts at initial diplomatic relations were made during the Philippine Revolution and the time of the First Philippine Republic, most nations have established diplomatic relations with the Philippines only in the years after the country achieved independence from the United States in 1946.

The first documented instance of a diplomatic mission of the Philippines being established abroad was that of the embassy in Tokyo, which was opened by the Second Philippine Republic, a puppet state of the Empire of Japan, on March 24, 1944 with Jorge B. Vargas as its first ambassador. However, the mission was summarily closed with Japan's defeat in World War II, and as it was never recognized by the pre-war Commonwealth of the Philippines, the oldest continually-operating Philippine diplomatic mission is that of the embassy in Washington, D.C., replacing the office of the Resident Commissioner of the Philippines after the country achieved independence from the United States on July 4, 1946, and led by Joaquín Miguel Elizalde as its first ambassador. This was followed shortly thereafter with the establishment of the permanent mission to the United Nations.

A number of missions were opened in the first years after independence. In his 1947 State of the Nation Address (SONA), President Manuel Roxas announced that missions in a number of other cities were also opened aside from the embassy in Washington, D.C.; these included the first consulates general in New York City, San Francisco, and Honolulu, as well as consulates in Xiamen and Hong Kong. Additional missions were opened the following year, including the first missions in Europe (in London, Madrid and Rome) and Latin America (in Buenos Aires). By 1952, the Philippine foreign service had grown to encompass missions in 11 countries, and by 1965 grew further to missions in 36 countries worldwide.

The Philippines' diplomatic presence grew significantly during the presidency of Ferdinand Marcos, spurred in part by the normalization of relations with the Eastern Bloc in the early 1970s. Philippine diplomatic missions were present in 43 countries by 1978, with additional missions opening the following year, particularly in the Middle East. By 1981, there were 63 countries worldwide hosting Philippine diplomatic missions. Several missions, however, would be closed at the tail end of the Marcos presidency and in the years thereafter as part of a series of cost reduction programs.

Another expansion of the country's diplomatic presence took place during the presidency of Gloria Macapagal Arroyo, with 67 countries hosting Philippine diplomatic missions by the end of her presidency. This, however, was not without controversy: in 2010 Senator Franklin Drilon questioned the need for embassies in countries with small Filipino communities, calling for a review of the Philippines' diplomatic presence worldwide. Arroyo's successor, Benigno Aquino III, then announced two years later the closure of ten posts (seven embassies and three consulates general): Caracas, Venezuela; Koror, Palau; Dublin, Ireland; Stockholm, Sweden; Bucharest, Romania; Havana, Cuba; Helsinki, Finland; Barcelona, Spain; Frankfurt, Germany and Saipan, Northern Mariana Islands. The closures have since been largely reversed under Aquino's successor, Rodrigo Duterte, as the consulate in Barcelona was set to reopen by 2019 after the House of Representatives passed a resolution urging the DFA to do so. On 24 September 2018, the consulate general in Houston was reopened, 25 years after its closure, while the consulate general in Frankfurt was reopened on 15 January 2019, and the embassy in Stockholm was reopened on 11 May 2020.

On January 14, 2019, the Philippines opened its embassy in Copenhagen, Denmark, the first new embassy to open since 2012, while the first new consulate to open since 2012 opened in Nagoya, Japan on December 1, 2020. In recent years, the government has announced its intention to open new missions, including new embassies in Colombia, Ethiopia, Kazakhstan, Panama, and Ukraine, as well as reopening the embassies in Cuba, Ireland, and Palau.

Current missions

Africa

Americas

Asia

Europe

Oceania

Multilateral organizations

Gallery

Closed missions

Africa

Americas

Asia

Europe

Oceania

Multilateral organizations

See also
 Foreign relations of the Philippines
 List of ambassadors to the Philippines
 List of diplomatic missions in the Philippines
 Sentro Rizal
 Visa policy of the Philippines

Notes

References

External links
 

Philippines
 
Diplomatic missions